The 15th Composite Anti-Aircraft Regiment, Royal New Zealand Artillery was a territorial air defence regiment of the New Zealand Army. The regiment was formed in 1948 and disbanded in 1954. Its heavy battery briefly became an independent unit, before becoming part of the newly formed 12th Heavy Anti-Aircraft Regiment in 1956.

References

Artillery regiments of New Zealand
Military units and formations established in 1948
Military units and formations disestablished in 1954